Luke Fowler (born 1978) is an artist, 16mm filmmaker and musician based in Glasgow.  He studied printmaking at Duncan of Jordanstone College of Art and Design in Dundee. He creates cinematic collages that have often been linked to the British Free Cinema movement of the 1950s.  His para-documentary films have explored counter cultural figures including Scottish psychiatrist R. D. Laing, English composer Cornelius Cardew and Marxist-Historian E.P. Thompson.  As well portraits of musicians and composers he has also made films and installations that deal with the nature of sound itself. Luke Fowler has worked with a number of collaborators including Eric La Casa, George Clark and Peter Hutton   Mark Fell, Lee Patterson, Toshiya Tsunoda  and Richard Youngs. He collaborated with guitarist Keith Rowe and film maker and curator Peter Todd on the live sound and film work The Room.

Work
Luke Fowler's work explores the limits and conventions of biographical and documentary film-making  with an emphasis on sound, marginalised communities and radical voices.

Exhibitions

In 2009, retrospective exhibition at the Serpentine Gallery. 
In 2010 in Rencontres d'Arles festival (France). 
In 2011, 'British Art Show 7' at the Hayward Gallery, London. 
In 2012, he was shortlisted for the Turner Prize, for solo exhibition at Inverleith House in Edinburgh,  which showcased his new film exploring the life and work of Scottish psychiatrist R.D. Laing.

Awards

Shortlisted for the 2005 Beck's Futures prize in December 2004
Derek Jarman Award in 2008
2010 Foundation for Contemporary Arts Grants to Artists Award

References

External links 
A portrait by spike art quarterly
https://www.luke-fowler.com/
Conversation with Luke Fowler, 2019

Living people
Alumni of the University of Dundee
Scottish film directors
1978 births
Scottish contemporary artists